Kathleen de la Peña McCook is a library scholar, librarian, and activist. Much of her work centers around social justice, human rights, First Amendment issues, and the freedom of information.

McCook has been active in a number of professional organizations within the field of librarianship. She was highly involved in the American Library Association's Committee on the Status of Women in Librarianship. She was the recipient of their 2016 Elizabeth Martinez Lifetime Achievement Award. She is a past president of the Association for Library and Information Science Education and the recipient of the 2003 Beta Phi Mu Award for "distinguished service in library education".

McCook has taught full-time since 1978. She has served on the faculties of Dominican University, the University of Illinois at Urbana-Champaign, and Louisiana State University. Currently, she is serving as a Distinguished University Professor at the University of South Florida's School of Information. She also served as 2003 scholar-in-residence for the Chicago Public Library.

Awards and honors
 2019 Joseph W. Lippincott Award for distinguished service to the profession of librarianship
 2004 ALA Office of Diversity, Achievement in Diversity Research Honoree
 1997 President of the Association of Library and Information Science Education
 1991 Named Outstanding Alumni by the University of Wisconsin–Madison School of Library and Information Studies

Selected bibliography

References

External links
 Faculty web page at the University of South Florida
 Ebla to E-Books: The Preservation and Annihilation of Memory by Kathleen McCook at Substack

American librarians
American women librarians
Hispanic and Latino American librarians
American librarianship and human rights
Living people
University of Chicago Graduate Library School alumni
University of South Florida faculty
University of Wisconsin–Madison School of Library and Information Studies alumni
Year of birth missing (living people)
American people of Scotch-Irish descent
American women academics
21st-century American women